The 2013 Duke Blue Devils football team represented Duke University in the 2013 NCAA Division I FBS football season as a member of the Atlantic Coast Conference (ACC) in the Coastal Division.. The team was led by head coach David Cutcliffe, in his sixth year, and played its home games at Wallace Wade Stadium in Durham, North Carolina.

The 2013 season was one of the best for Duke in its 125-year history. The Blue Devils finished the regular season with a 10–2 record and the most wins in team history. They also won their first ACC Coastal Division title and a berth in the 2013 ACC Championship Game against Florida State. Duke lost to Florida State, 45–7, and earned a bid to the 2013 Chick-fil-A Bowl against Texas A&M, where they were defeated 52–48.

Schedule

Personnel

Coaching staff

Roster

Game summaries

North Carolina Central

at Memphis

Georgia Tech

Pittsburgh

Troy

Navy

at Virginia

at No. 16 Virginia Tech

NC State

No. 24 Miami (FL)

at Wake Forest

at North Carolina

vs. No. 1 Florida State (2013 ACC Championship Game)

vs. No. 20 Texas A&M (Chick-fil-A Bowl)

Rankings

References

Duke
Duke Blue Devils football seasons
Duke Blue Devils football